The red-billed tyrannulet (Zimmerius cinereicapilla) is a species of bird in the family Tyrannidae. It is found in Bolivia, Ecuador, and Peru. Its natural habitats are subtropical or tropical moist lowland forests and subtropical or tropical moist montane forests.

References

red-billed tyrannulet
Birds of the Peruvian Andes
red-billed tyrannulet
Taxonomy articles created by Polbot